Osetno may refer to the following places in Poland:
Osetno, Lower Silesian Voivodeship (south-west Poland)
Osetno, Podlaskie Voivodeship (north-east Poland)
Osetno, Warmian-Masurian Voivodeship (north Poland)
Osetno, West Pomeranian Voivodeship (north-west Poland)